Patersdorf is a municipality in the district of Regen in Bavaria in Germany.

References

Regen (district)